Barbodes clemensi is an extinct species of cyprinid endemic to Lake Lanao in Mindanao, the Philippines. It was one of the several species of fish in the Philippines known as bagangan.  This species can reach a length of  TL.

References

Barbodes
Freshwater fish of the Philippines
Endemic fauna of the Philippines
Fauna of Mindanao
Fish described in 1924
Taxonomy articles created by Polbot